Alderwood Manor is a census-designated place (CDP) in Snohomish County, Washington, United States. The population was 10,198 at the 2020 census. Prior to the 2000 census, Alderwood Manor was counted as part of the Alderwood Manor-Bothell North CDP.

Geography
According to the United States Census Bureau, the CDP has a total area of 4.8 square miles (12.4 km2).

Parts of Alderwood Manor lie in the Lynnwood MUGA (Municipal Urban Growth Area). Depending on location, buildings in Alderwood Manor may use either Lynnwood, Bothell, or Brier mailing addresses.

History

Alderwood Manor was a community that is now the cities of Lynnwood, Brier, and Mountlake Terrace. Alderwood Manor was a farming community where most residents raised chickens. Alderwood Manor was connected to Everett and Seattle by the interurban trolley system. Most signs of Alderwood have since disappeared but in 2004 Lynnwood's Heritage Park opened. The Heritage Park has some old buildings of the Lynnwood area, such as The Wickers Building, which served as Alderwood's main store and post office from 1919-1960s. Other buildings included Car 55 of the interurban.

In 1979 Lynnwood's largest tourist attraction, the Alderwood Mall was built.

The only Alderwood Manor building still in the same place as when it was built is the old Masonic Temple. The Manor Hardware building (originally used as a schoolhouse in the early 1900s, but which had been vacant for many years) was demolished in 2015. Both locations are just off of 196th St SW in Lynnwood. Some private homes still stand in the area as well.

Demographics

2000 census
As of the census of 2000, there were 15,329 people, 5,558 households, and 4,090 families residing in the CDP. The population density was 3,194.6 people per square mile (1,233.0/km2). There were 5,743 housing units at an average density of 1,196.8/sq mi (462.0/km2). The racial makeup of the CDP was 52.12% White, 14.62% African American, 0.86% Native American, 9.82% Asian, 0.46% Pacific Islander, 1.59% from other races, and 3.53% from two or more races. Hispanic or Latino of any race were 26.97% of the population.

There were 5,558 households, out of which 40.6% had children under the age of 18 living with them, 60.4% were married couples living together, 9.2% had a female householder with no husband present, and 26.4% were non-families. 19.4% of all households were made up of individuals, and 5.9% had someone living alone who was 65 years of age or older. The average household size was 2.75 and the average family size was 3.17.

In the CDP, the age distribution of the population shows 28.1% under the age of 18, 7.1% from 18 to 24, 34.5% from 25 to 44, 21.6% from 45 to 64, and 8.7% who were 65 years of age or older. The median age was 35 years. For every 100 females, there were 98.3 males. For every 100 females age 18 and over, there were 96.4 males.

The median income for a household in the CDP was $61,199, and the median income for a family was $68,679. Males had a median income of $45,807 versus $33,099 for females. The per capita income for the CDP was $24,012. About 2.4% of families and 3.6% of the population were below the poverty line, including 4.0% of those under age 18 and 2.4% of those age 65 or over.

Notable residents
Edward Nixon, consultant and brother of President Richard Nixon

References

External links
 Alderwood Manor Heritage Association
 Heritage Park at the City of Lynnwood website

Census-designated places in Snohomish County, Washington
Census-designated places in Washington (state)